Into the Silence may refer to:

 Into the Silence (Sethian album), 2003
 Into the Silence (Avishai Cohen album), 2016
 "Into the Silence" (song), a 2012 song by Robbie Williams from the album Take the Crown